Sergei Sarana (born 7 December 1978) is a professional footballer. He made his professional debut in the Ukrainian Premier League in 1996 for FC Metalist Kharkiv. He was a main goalie for Arsenal Kharkiv in the beginning of the 2000s. In 2004, he moved to Kazakhstan. After a brief stint at FC Atyrau he moved to Karaganda club FC Shakhter.

Honours
 Kazakhstan Premier League bronze: 2007.

External links
 
 

1978 births
Living people
People from Lozova
Ukrainian emigrants to Kazakhstan
Ukrainian footballers
Ukrainian expatriate footballers
Expatriate footballers in Kazakhstan
Kazakhstani footballers
FC Metalist Kharkiv players
FC Metalist-2 Kharkiv players
FC Shakhter Karagandy players
FC Akzhayik players
FC Arsenal Kharkiv players
Association football goalkeepers
Sportspeople from Kharkiv Oblast